The 2012 Turkmenistan Higher League (Ýokary Liga) season was the 20th season of Turkmenistan's professional football league. It started on 10 April 2012 with the first round of games and will end in November.

Teams

League table

Top goal-scorers
The top scorers are:

References

External links
 2012 Ýokary Liga 
 Official news site 
 Asian Football Confederation 

Ýokary Liga seasons
Turk
Turk
1